Tolkusha is a traditional food of the Chukotko-Kamchatkan peoples in the Russian Far East, especially Kamchatka. It is made of dried fish meat or fish roe mixed with fat (seal or reindeer) and berries (bilberry or crowberry) extended with edible plant bulbs or stems, ground and pounded together for a long time to yield a white paste.

Tolkusha is a Russian word, coming from the verb толочь [] = to bruise, to crush, to pound, to tamp. The indigenous names for tolkusha include Chukchi: , Kerek: , Koryak: , Alutor: , Palana:  or Itelmen: .

See also 
 Pemmican

References 

Indigenous cuisine
Kamchatka Peninsula
Siberian cuisine
Dried fish
Roe dishes
Animal fat products

Chukchi cuisine